Gymnopilus rufescens is a species of mushroom-forming fungus in the family Hymenogastraceae.

Description

Habitat and distribution
Gymnopilus rufescens grows on conifer wood, and has been found in California during December.

See also

List of Gymnopilus species

References

rufescens
Fungi of North America
Fungi described in 1969
Taxa named by Lexemuel Ray Hesler